"Head, Shoulders, Knees and Toes" is a children's song. The song was documented as early as 1961. It is often sung to the tune of "There Is a Tavern in the Town", although it is sometimes sung to the tune of "London Bridge Is Falling Down".

Description
There is generally only one verse with lyrics similar to those below.  The second line repeats the first line both in words and in melody, the third line has a rising tone, and the fourth line repeats the first two. Children might dance while they sing the song and touch their head, shoulders, knees, and toes in sequence to the words.

Lyrics

Head, shoulders, knees and toes, 
knees and toes
Head, shoulders, knees and toes,
knees and toes
And eyes and ears and mouth and nose
Head, shoulders, knees and toes,
knees and toes.
 
The lyrics can also be sung in reverse, like this:
 
Toes, knees and shoulders, head, 
shoulders, head
Toes, knees and shoulders, head,
shoulders, head
And nose and mouth and ears and eyes
Toes, knees and shoulders, head,
shoulders, head.
Each verse is repeated, with one word being omitted each time, just touching their body parts, without actually saying the word. For example:

Verse 2
----, shoulders, knees and toes

Verse 3
----, ----, knees and toes

Verse 4
----, ----, ----, and toes

Verse 5
----, ----, ----, and ----
 
This pattern continues until all the words are omitted. The last verse consists of no actual singing or singing all lyrics, but sometimes at a much faster tempo.

There is a song that was adapted from the traditional; it uses another tune and says, "Eyes and ears", "Chin/Mouth and nose" and suggests touching the body parts as in the traditional song.  Another alternative from the traditional starts the line with "Eyes" and includes "chin;" however, it has the words in an order that causes the motions to zig zag.

Today there are many derivative songs that similarly teach the vocabulary of body parts.  One example, using the same tune, as featured on the Kidsongs video entitled, "Boppin' with the Biggles" is as follows:

 Feet and tummies arms and chins, 
 arms and chins
 Feet and tummies arms and chins, 
 arms and chins
 And eyes and ears and mouth and shins
 Feet and tummies arms and chins, 
 arms and chins

 Hands and fingers legs and lips,
 legs and lips
 Hands and fingers legs and lips,
 legs and lips
 And eyes and ears and mouth and hips
 Hands and fingers legs and lips,
 legs and lips

References

English folk songs
English children's songs
Traditional children's songs
Singing games